Ali Ahmed Salem Al-Yazidi (born March 30, 1973) is an athlete from Qatar, who competes in archery.

2008 Summer Olympics
At the 2008 Summer Olympics in Beijing Salem finished his ranking round with a total of 627 points, which gave him the 57th seed for the final competition bracket in which he faced Im Dong-Hyun in the first round. Im won the match by 108-103 and Salem was eliminated. Im would lose in the third round against Vic Wunderle.

References

1973 births
Living people
Qatari male archers
Archers at the 2008 Summer Olympics
Olympic archers of Qatar
Archers at the 2002 Asian Games
Archers at the 2006 Asian Games
Archers at the 2010 Asian Games
Archers at the 2014 Asian Games
Archers at the 2018 Asian Games
Asian Games competitors for Qatar